The seventh series of The Bill, a British television drama, consisted of 105 episodes, broadcast between 1 January – 31 December 1991. The series was released on DVD for the first time on 6 June 2012, in Australia. It features the above artwork, which features images of Sgt. Alec Peters and WDC Viv Martella.

A number of cast and crew commentaries for Series 7 episodes have been recorded, available exclusively for subscribers of The Bill Podcast Patreon Channel. These include "The Chase", "Cry Havoc", "Lest We Forget", "The Negotiator" and "They Also Serve".

Cast changes

Arrivals
 Sgt Matthew Boyden (Episode 90-)
 WPC Donna Harris (Episode 93-)

Departures
 Sgt Joseph Corrie - Unexplained
 PC Phil Young - commits suicide

Episodes

References

1991 British television seasons
The Bill series